The Thai Wikipedia is the Thai language edition of Wikipedia. It was started on 25 December 2003. As of March 2022, Wikipedia (all languages combined) was ranked 14th in Alexa's Top Sites Thailand.

As of January 2021, the Thai Wikipedia is the most visited Wikipedia in both Thailand and Laos. In Laos the position of the most popular language version of Wikipedia alternates between English and Thai.

On 31 January 2006, the Thai Wikipedia was first recognized along with English Wikipedia in the Thai press. In 2007, a thesis, Thai Wikipedia and Communicating Knowledge to the Public, was published by a graduate student from the Faculty of Fine and Applied Arts, Chulalongkorn University.

The Thai Wikipedia was mentioned during a public forum during the 2005-2006 Thai political crisis when a speaker suggested that Thai people should read Wikipedia's article on Thaksin Shinawatra, the former prime minister.

The Thai Wikipedia is the second online encyclopedia in the Thai language after the Thai Junior Encyclopedia Project, which was developed under the patronage of King Bhumibol Adulyadej.

Timeline 

 25 December 2003: The Thai main page created after first created on 16 March 2003 with the word "Describe the new page here."
 27 December 2003: The first article created containing only one word "ดาราศาสตร์" (astronomy) and 32 interwiki links. After that it became a stub on 31 May 2004.
 28 February 2004: The real first article, วิทยาการคอมพิวเตอร์ (computer science), was created.
 21 April 2004: 100th article, ห้องอนาคต (Time & Time Travel, a fiction)
 17 August 2004: 500th article, สนเกรวิลเลีย (Grevillea)
 10 March 2005: 1,000th article, แฮร์รี่ พอตเตอร์ (Harry Potter)
 1 May 2005: The first featured article, แฟร็กทัล (fractal)
 September 2005: More than 30 university students registered and wrote articles as their homework.
 28 October 2005: 5,000th article, เปาบุ้นจิ้น (Bao Zheng)
 31 January 2006: Press coverage in onopen.com
 March 2006: Mass content addition of articles about years from 543 BC (Buddhist Era 1) to about 1800 semi-manually by using JavaScript. About 2,500 stubs are added.
 14 March 2006: 10,000th article, มหาวิทยาลัยเพนซิลเวเนียสเตต (Pennsylvania State University)
 16 March 2007: 20,000th article, อาริเอส มู (Aries Mu)
 10 December 2007: 30,000th article, หลิว เต๋อหัว (Andy Lau)
 26 October 2008: 40,000th article, ฤทธิ์ดาบไม้ไผ่ (Bamboo Blade)
 4 September 2009: 50,000th article, พระนันทะ (Nanda, half brother of Buddha)
 30 January 2016: 100,000th article, คริสต์ทศวรรษ 1940 (1940s)

References 
 Statistics page of Thai Wikipedia
 Usage statistics from Wikimedia

External links 

 Thai Wikipedia 
 Thai Wikipedia mobile version  
 Press coverage in onopen.com 

Wikipedias by language
Internet properties established in 2003
Thai-language mass media
Thai encyclopedias